Montfort Stokes (1762–1842) was a U.S. Senator from North Carolina from 1816 to 1823. Senator Stokes may also refer to:

Connie Stokes (born 1953), Georgia State Senate
Edward C. Stokes (1860–1942), New Jersey State Senate
John Stokes (North Carolina judge) (1756–1790), North Carolina State Senate
Walter W. Stokes (1880–1960), New York State Senate
William Brickly Stokes (1814–1897), Tennessee State Senate

See also
 Stokes (surname)
 Stokes (disambiguation)